The Grote Markt is the central market square of Haarlem, Netherlands.

According to the 1911 Encyclopædia Britannica;

Buildings of interest
Frans Hals Museum - Hal
Grote Kerk, Haarlem
Haarlem City Hall
Statue of Johann Costerus
Archaeological Museum of Haarlem
The Vleeshal
The Verweyhal

References

Streets in Haarlem
Squares in the Netherlands